Where No One Knows My Name was the first full-length release from the San Francisco, California, punk rock band, Enemy You. It was released in 1999 through Panic Button Records and Lookout! Records.

Track listing
"Automaton" – 1:47
"Youth Anthems" – 1:47
"City of Lost Children" – 3:01
"Moral Absolutes" – 1:34
"By Design" – 1:26
"Awake" – 1:49
"All Good Things..." – 1:46
"Break Away" – 1:02
"Where No One Knows My Name" – 3:01
"Lock-Out" – 1:57
"(We Want) Someone To Blame" – 1:28
"Lord of The Flies" – 0:54
"Younger Days" – 2:15
"Hopes And Dreams" – 1:43

External links
 Enemy You Official Site
 Enemy You Myspace Site

1999 albums